Sergey Alexandrovich Kolesnikov (born 3 September 1986) is a Russian former professional track and road bicycle racer.

Major results

Road

2005
 2nd Overall Grand Prix of Sochi
 3rd Grand Prix of Moscow
2006
 1st Tour du Finistère
 1st Overall Circuit des Ardennes
1st Stage 2
 1st Overall Tour of Hainan
 1st Overall GP Sochi
1st Stage 4
 1st Classic Loire Atlantique
 1st Riga GP
 1st La Roue Tourangelle
 1st Ruota d'Oro
 2nd Grand Prix de Beuvry-la-Forêt
 3rd Grand Prix of Moscow
 4th Overall Tour of South China Sea
 6th Overall Tour de Serbie
 6th Tartu GP
 8th Road race, UCI Under-23 Road World Championships
 8th Tallinn–Tartu GP
2007
 2nd Road race, National Road Championships
 4th Halle–Ingooigem
 10th Grote Prijs Jef Scherens
2009
 1st Overall Bałtyk–Karkonosze Tour
 1st Stage 3 Vuelta a Costa Rica
 2nd Grand Prix of Donetsk
 2nd Gran Premio San Giuseppe
 2nd Poreč Trophy
 3rd Overall Paths of King Nikola
 10th Overall Five Rings of Moscow

Track
2004
 2nd  Team pursuit, European Junior Championships
 3rd  Team pursuit, UCI Junior World Championships
2005
 1st  Team pursuit, European Under-23 Championships
2006
 2nd  Team pursuit, European Under-23 Championships
2007
 3rd Points race, Los Angeles, UCI World Cup Classics
2008
 3rd  Madison (with Ivan Kovalev), European Championships
 3rd Madison, Manchester (with Ivan Kovalev), UCI World Cup Classics
2009
 2nd  Madison (with Alexey Shmidt), European Championships
 3rd Madison, Manchester (with Alexey Shmidt), UCI World Cup Classics

External links 

1986 births
Living people
Russian male cyclists
Russian track cyclists
Place of birth missing (living people)